The 1950 South Carolina gubernatorial election was held on November 7, 1950, to select the governor of the state of South Carolina. James F. Byrnes won the Democratic primary and ran unopposed in the general election becoming the 104th governor of South Carolina.

Democratic primary
The South Carolina Democratic Party held their primary for governor on July 11. The race was a cakewalk for the popular James F. Byrnes as he faced minimal opposition in the Democratic primary.

General election
The general election was held on November 7, 1950 and James F. Byrnes was elected the next governor of South Carolina without opposition. Being a non-presidential election and few contested races, turnout was much lower than the Democratic primary election.

 

|-
| 
| colspan=5 |Democratic hold
|-

See also
Governor of South Carolina
List of governors of South Carolina
South Carolina gubernatorial elections

References

"Supplemental Report of the Secretary of State to the General Assembly of South Carolina." Reports and Resolutions of South Carolina to the General Assembly of the State of South Carolina. Columbia, South Carolina: 1951, p. 11.

External links
SCIway Biography of Governor James Francis Byrnes

1950
1950 United States gubernatorial elections
Gubernatorial
November 1950 events in the United States